Cèmuhî (Camuhi, Camuki, Tyamuhi, Wagap) is an Oceanic language spoken on the island of New Caledonia, in the area of Poindimié, Koné, and Touho. The language has approximately 3,300 speakers and is considered a regional language of France.

Phonology

Consonants
The consonants of Cèmuhî (after Rivierre 1980) are shown in the table below.

Rivierre (1980) analyzes the contrasts of Cèmuhî along three emic categories: nasal, semi-nasal (i.e. prenasalized), and oral consonants.

Vowels
The chart below shows Cèmuhî vowels, all of which can contrast in both length and nasality.

Tone
Like its neighbour Paicî, Cèmuhî is one of the few Austronesian languages which have developed contrastive tone. However, unlike other New Caledonian tonal languages, Cèmuhî has three tonal registers: high, mid, and low tones.

See also
 Northern New Caledonian languages

Notes

Bibliography
  (1972). Les Tons de la langue de Touho (Nouvelle-Calédonie) : Etude diachronique. Bulletin de la Société de Linguistique de Paris, 1972, vol.67, n°1, p. 301-316.

External links
 Audio recordings in the Cèmuhî language, in open access, by Jean-Claude Rivierre (source: Pangloss Collection).

New Caledonian languages
Languages of New Caledonia
Tonal languages in non-tonal families